The 2001 World Table Tennis Championships –  women's team (Corbillon Cup) was the 39th edition of the women's team championship.

China won the gold medal defeating North Korea in the final 3–0. Japan and South Korea won bronze medals.

Medalists

Final stage knockout phase

Round of 16

Quarter finals

Semifinals

Final

See also
List of World Table Tennis Championships medalists

References

-